Gruban may refer to:

Gruban Malić, fictional character and anti-hero in Miodrag Bulatović's novel Heroj na magarcu ili Vreme srama (Hero on a Donkey)
Gruban v Booth, 1917 fraud case in England

See also
Groban (disambiguation)